Imadaddin Nasimi (1369–1417) was an Azerbaijani or Turkmen Ḥurūfī poet.

Nasimi or Nesimi may also refer to:

Places
 Nasimi, Bilasuvar, Azerbaijan, a village
 Nasimi, Sabirabad, Azerbaijan, a village
 Nasimi raion, a settlement and raion of Baku, Azerbaijan
 Nasimi (Baku Metro), a railway station in Baku, Azerbaijan

People
 Kul Nesîmî (fl. 17th century), Ottoman Alevi-Bektashi poet in Anatolia
 Nasimi Aghayev, Azerbaijani diplomat

Other uses
 Nesimi (film), a 1973 Azerbaijani biographical drama about Imadaddin Nasimi

See also
 Nəsimi (disambiguation)